Kmt is a magazine on ancient Egypt published quarterly by Kmt Communications. The first issue was published in Spring 1990. The magazine is produced in Weaverville, North Carolina and presents feature stories, reports from recent excavations, announcements of upcoming lectures and symposia, and book reviews.
The name of the magazine is derived from  'km.t', the name of Ancient Egypt in hieroglyphics.

See also
Km (hieroglyph)

References

External links
 

1990 establishments in North Carolina
History magazines published in the United States
Quarterly magazines published in the United States
English-language magazines
Magazines established in 1990
Magazines published in North Carolina